Praseodymium phosphide is an inorganic compound of praseodymium and phosphorus with the chemical formula PrP. The compound forms crystals.

Synthesis
Heating metal praseodymium and phosphorus in the presence of iodine vapor:
 4 Pr + P4 -> 4 PrP

Physical properties
Praseodymium phosphide forms crystals of a cubic system, space group Fmm, with cell parameters a = 0.5872 nm, Z = 4, and structure like sodium chloride NaCl.

The compound melts congruently at 3120 °C.

References

Phosphides
Praseodymium compounds
Rock salt crystal structure